Friars Club can refer to:

Organizations
 Friars Club of Beverly Hills, also known as the "Friars Club of California"
 New York Friars Club
 The Friars (club), Louisiana State University, also known as "The Friars Club"

Other uses
 Friar's Inn, a 1920s jazz venue in Chicago, called "Friars Club" in some sources
 "The Friar's Club", the 128th episode of Seinfeld

See also
 The Friars Senior Society of the University of Pennsylvania, commonly nicknamed "Friars"
 The Friar Society, the oldest honor society at University of Texas at Austin